Michelle Sawyers (born 25 October 1960) is a former defender from Australia who made 13 appearances for the Australia women's national soccer team.

Playing career 
Sawyers started playing in 1973 at age 13 for Coalstars SC. She would stay at Coalstars for her entire senior career, which lasted until 1992.

Sawyers was later selected in the FFA International Team of the Decade for 1979–89.

References

1960 births
Living people
Women's association football defenders
Australian women's soccer players
Australia women's international soccer players